Uralla is a suburb on the outskirts of Katherine, Northern Territory, Australia. It is within the Katherine Town Council local government area. The area was officially defined as a suburb in April 2007, adopting the name of an agricultural lease first taken up in 1961 and later subdivided to form the present day suburb. Uralla is characterised by small farms and rural-residential development.

References

Suburbs of Katherine, Northern Territory